M-Flo Inside was a compilation album released on March 17, 2004 by the Japanese hip-hop group, M-Flo, containing tracks produced by and featuring the group and its members.

Track listing
"What Is 'M-Flo Inside'?" ~ intro
"Reeeplay!" by DJ Hasebe / M-Flo Loves Crystal Kay
"Miss You" [remixed by Free Tempo] / M-Flo Loves Melody. & 山本領平 (Ryohei Yamamoto)
"Speedy Wonder" / Mic Banditz
"Radio Radio" / Mic Banditz
"Hey Boy..." / 日之内絵美 (Emi Hinouchi)
"Crying" / 日之内絵美 (Emi Hinouchi)
"Candy Pop" featuring Soul'd Out / Heartsdales
"Body Rock" / Heartsdales
"M-Flo Is Dope!": interlude
"Just Say So" / Suite Chic
"Spectacular" / Fantastic Plastic Machine
"Hard to Say" / Crystal Kay
"Get Out!" featuring Bonnie Pink & Verbal / DJ Hasebe
"Aida" (020609 Tachytelic Remix)
"3rd Album Snippet Dub": outro

M-Flo albums
2005 compilation albums
Avex Group compilation albums